WPBI-LD (channel 16) is a low-power television station in Lafayette, Indiana, United States, affiliated with Fox and NBC. It is owned by Coastal Television Broadcasting Company LLC alongside ABC affiliate WPBY-LD (channel 35). Both stations share studios on South 18th Street in Lafayette, while WPBI-LD's transmitter is located on McCarty Lane on the city's east side; the signal is oriented to the northwest.

History 
The station's construction permit was issued by the Federal Communications Commission (FCC) on February 22, 2011, under the call sign of W16DB-D. The station's call sign was changed back and forth between WPBH-LD and WPBI-LD in August and October 2016 until October 18, 2016, when WPBI was settled upon. WPBI-LD started airing on October 25, 2016. The station signed on from the start as the Lafayette area's Fox affiliate, with NBC being launched on the second subchannel. Prior to the launch of WPBI-LD its owner, Lafayette TV LLC purchased four Lafayette market radio stations from Artistic Media Partners Inc.

WPBI-LD's two subchannels are the first Fox and NBC affiliates ever based in the Lafayette market; before the station signed on, Indianapolis television stations WXIN and WTHR served as the default Fox and NBC affiliates for Lafayette via cable and satellite. Cable television providers Comcast Xfinity and Metronet began carrying WPBI in November 2016. Despite discontinuing carriage of Indianapolis-based Fox and NBC affiliates, satellite television provider DirecTV has said it plans to carry WPBI-LD and WPBI-LD2 but has not announced its timetable for doing so.

From 1953 until WPBI's 2016 launch, WLFI-TV had been the only "Big Three" (ABC, CBS and NBC—or, including Fox, "big four") network television broadcaster in the Lafayette market.

Programming

Sports programming
WPBI-LD1 carries select Purdue Boilermakers football games via Fox College Football.

WPBI-LD2 blacks out NBC's live broadcast of the Indianapolis 500 to prevent Indianapolis market viewers from driving to Lafayette to see the race, and airs it on tape delay along with WTHR.

News operation
After beginning local weather coverage on January 1, 2017, WPBI aired its inaugural Star City News broadcast on May 29, 2017. WPBI presently broadcasts 7½ hours of local newscasts each week, all on weekdays. The newscasts air at 6:00 and 11:00 p.m. on NBC 16 and at 10:00 p.m. on Fox 16. The 6 p.m. newscast is exclusive to WPBI-LD2, while the 11 p.m. newscast also simulcasts on WPBY-LD.

Chris Morisse Vizza, a 10-year veteran of WLFI-TV, is WPBI's first news director. Sarah Blakely is the station's inaugural news anchor, broadcasting from a Media Gateway-owned studio in Little Rock, Arkansas, airing segments from Lafayette-based Vizza. Blakely also anchors similar newscasts on sister station KJNB-LD in Jonesboro, Arkansas.

Radio tie-ins of the newscasts are planned for WSHY, WBPE, WYCM, and WAZY-FM.

Subchannels
The station's digital signal is multiplexed:

References

External links

 
 

Low-power television stations in the United States
Fox network affiliates
NBC network affiliates
PBI-LD
Television channels and stations established in 2016
2016 establishments in Indiana